Kulustay is a rural locality (a station) in Chernigovsky Selsoviet of Arkharinsky District, Amur Oblast, Russia. The population was 4 as of 2018.

Geography 
Kulustay is located near the left bank of the Bureya River, 57 km north of Arkhara (the district's administrative centre) by road. Kamenka is the nearest rural locality.

References 

Rural localities in Arkharinsky District